The Black Hole is a 1982 video game published by Funsoft.

Gameplay
The Black Hole is a game in which the player first flies a ship through a long tunnel avoiding projectiles, before coming to a wall protecting creatures, and in the third phase the player attacks the large mother ship.

Reception
Dick McGrath reviewed the game for Computer Gaming World, and stated that "Black Hole is just an average arcade game but considering the variation provided by the three separate phases I would rate it a 6.5 out of 10."

References

External links
80-U.S. article about Funsoft

1982 video games
Fixed shooters
TRS-80 games
TRS-80-only games
Video games developed in the United States
Video games set in outer space